The 2010–11 UTSA Roadrunners men's basketball team represented the University of Texas at San Antonio in the 2010–11 college basketball season. This was head coach Brooks Thompson's fifth season at UTSA. They played their home games at the Convocation Center. The Roadrunners finished the season 20–14, 9–7 in Southland play to finish in third place in the West Division. They won the Southland Basketball tournament to advance to the NCAA tournament. UTSA defeated  in the First Four, 70–61, before falling to top-seed Ohio State in the round of 64.

Roster

Schedule and results
Source
All times are Central

|-
!colspan=9 style=| Regular season

|-
!colspan=9 style=| Southland Conference Tournament 

|-
!colspan=9 style=| NCAA Tournament

References

UTSA Roadrunners men's basketball seasons
Utsa
UTSA Roadrunners basketball
UTSA Roadrunners basketball
Utsa